The 2008–09 First Women's Banca Intesa League is the 3rd season of the First Women's Basketball League of Serbia, the highest professional basketball league in Serbia. It is also 65th national championship played by Serbian clubs inclusive of nation's previous incarnations as Yugoslavia and Serbia & Montenegro.

The first part of the season consists of 12 teams and 132-game regular season began on 11 October 2008 and will end on 14 March 2009. The second part of the season is the Play Off.

Regular season
The League part of the season was played with 12 teams and play a dual circuit system, each with each one game at home and away. The four best teams at the end of the regular season were placed in the Play Off. The regular season began on 11 October 2008 and it will end on 14 March 2009.

Play Off
Play Off is played according to the cup system. Champion is received after the final was played. In all parts of Play Off was played on 2 wins. Play Off is played from 24 March to 9 April 2009.

Awards
Player of the Year: Tamara Radočaj (168-G-87) of Hemofarm
Guard of the Year: Tamara Radočaj of Hemofarm
Forward of the Year: Anja Stupar (178-F/C-89) of Vojvodina NIS
Center of the Year: Biljana Stjepanović (189-C-87) of Partizan
Newcomer of the Year: Maja Škorić (184-F-89) of Čelarevo
Most Improved of the Year: Iva Roglić (189-F-88) of Crvena zvezda
Import Player of the Year: Hanna Tsikhamirava (175-G-88) of Hemofarm
Domestic Player of the Year: Tamara Radočaj of Hemofarm
Defensive Player of the Year: Anja Stupar of Vojvodina NIS
Coach of the Year: Marina Maljković of Hemofarm

1st Team
Tamara Radočaj of Hemofarm
Biljana Stanković (176-G-74) of Hemofarm
Anja Stupar of Vojvodina NIS
Jela Vidačić (190-C-85) of Proleter Zrenjanin
Biljana Stjepanović of Partizan

2nd Team
Iva Musulin (170-G-84) of Radivoj Korać
Dajana Butulija (175-G-86) of Hemofarm
Bojana Janković (185-F-83) of Partizan
Dragana Vuković (190-C-78) of Radivoj Korać
Tina Jovanović (191-F/C-91) of Loznica

Honorable Mention
Miljana Musović (180-G-87) of Crvena zvezda
Rada Vidović (177-G-79) of Spartak Subotica
Ivana Todorović (187-C-73) of Kraljevo
Marina Morača (180-F-85) of Čelarevo
Jelena Dangubić (177-G-82) of Partizan
Nataša Đorđević (178-G-85) of Kovin
Minja Šiljegović (188-F-80) of Vojvodina NIS
Ivana Mihailović (173-G-82) of Kraljevo
Mirjana Velisavljević (187-C-78) of Kovin
Maja Šćekić (170-G-87) of Vojvodina NIS
Dara Kovačević (197-C-83) of Hemofarm
Jelena Radić (193-C-87) of Partizan
Dragana Gobeljić (185-F-88) of Proleter Zrenjanin
Ivana Grubor (185-F/C-84) of Vojvodina NIS
Iva Roglić of Crvena zvezda

All-Domestic Players Team
Tamara Radočaj of Hemofarm
Biljana Stanković of Hemofarm
Anja Stupar of Vojvodina NIS
Jela Vidačić of Proleter Zrenjanin
Biljana Stjepanović of Partizan

All-Defensive Team
Marina Ristić (168-G-87) of Spartak Subotica
Dunja Prčić (180-G-87) of Crvena zvezda
Anja Stupar of Vojvodina NIS
Iva Roglić of Crvena zvezda
Jelena Maksimović (192-C-82) of Crvena zvezda

All-Newcomers Team
Marija Jugović (170-G-90) of Loznica
Jelena Jovanović (184-F-90) of Radivoj Korać
Maja Škorić of Čelarevo
Maja Vučurović (188-F-91) of Radivoj Korać
Tijana Ajduković (197-C-91) of Spartak Subotica

External links
 First Women's Banca Intesa League at eurobasket.com
 Regular season at srbijasport.net
 Play Off at srbijasport.net

First Women's Basketball League of Serbia seasons
Serbia
women